Li Wen (November 26, 1905 – April 20, 1977) was a KMT general from Hunan.

Li Wen was born in Xinhua County, Hunan in 1905. He joined the Kuomintang's army during the Northern Expedition.

Li surrendered to the People's Liberation Army of the CPC in December 1949, but escaped to Taiwan in 1950.

References

1905 births
1977 deaths
People from Loudi
National Revolutionary Army generals from Hunan